The 2016 K League Classic was the 34th season of the top division of South Korean professional football since its establishment in 1983, and the fourth season of the K League Classic.

Teams

General information

Stadiums

Managerial changes

Foreign players
Restricting the number of foreign players strictly to four per team, including a slot for a player from AFC countries. A team could use four foreign players on the field each game including a least one player from the AFC confederation. Players name in bold indicates the player is registered during the mid-season transfer window.

League table

Positions by matchday

Round 1–33

Round 34–38

Results

Matches 1–22 
Teams play each other twice, once at home, once away.

Matches 23–33
Teams play every other team once (either at home or away).

Matches 34–38
After 33 matches, the league splits into two sections of six teams each, with teams playing every other team in their section once (either at home or away). The exact matches are determined upon the league table at the time of the split.

Group A

Group B

Relegation playoffs

Player statistics

Top scorers

Top assist providers

Awards

Main awards 
The 2016 K League Awards was held on 8 November 2016.

Source:

Best XI 

Source:

Player of the Round

Manager of the Month

Attendance

Attendance by club 
Attendants who entered with free ticket are not counted.

Top matches

See also 
2016 in South Korean football
2016 K League Challenge
2016 Korean FA Cup

References

External links
Official website 
Official website 
Review at K League 

K League Classic seasons
1
South Korea
South Korea